is a private junior college in Kobe, Hyōgo, Japan, established in 1950. The predecessor of the school was founded in 1889.

External links

  
 Open campus in summer

Educational institutions established in 1950
Private universities and colleges in Japan
Universities and colleges in Hyōgo Prefecture
1950 establishments in Japan
Japanese junior colleges